Capital is a German-language monthly business magazine published by Gruner + Jahr in Hamburg, Germany.

History and profile
Capital  was established in 1956. The magazine is published monthly by Gruner + Jahr. It appears on the first Thursday of each month. However, at the beginning of the 2000s it was published on a biweekly basis. Horst von Buttlar is the editor-in-chief of the magazine which has its headquarters in Berlin.

Since 1970 the magazine has published annually the Kunstkompass (Art Compass), a hierarchy of mainstream artists and their ranking within the art market and mainstream art world. Art Compass has been an accurate indicator of art market and mainstream gallery success over that period, despite the open but imprecise and contingent factors that are used to create the mathematics within the league-table.

Circulation
In 2001 Capital had a circulation of 228,000 copies. In 2010 the circulation of the magazine was 175,240 copies. During the fourth quarter of 2014 it was 139,342 copies.

Editor-in-chiefs
 1962–1971: Adolf Theobald
 1971–1974: Ferdinand Simoneit
 1974–1980: Johannes Gross
 1980–1986: Ludolf Herrmann
 1987–1988: Dieter Piel
 1988–1991: Rolf Prudent
 1991–2001: Ralf-Dieter Brunowsky
 2002–2006: Kai Stepp
 2006–2009: Klaus Schweinsberg
 2009–2013: Steffen Klusmann
 since 2013: Horst von Buttlar

See also
 List of magazines in Germany

References

External links
Capital Official Website
Franci Zavrl: Our Industry In 2021

1956 establishments in West Germany
Business magazines published in Germany
German-language magazines
German news websites
Monthly magazines published in Germany
Magazines published in Hamburg
Magazines established in 1956